Sphegina amurensis is a species of hoverfly in the family Syrphidae.

Distribution
Russia.

References

Eristalinae
Insects described in 1984
Diptera of Asia